In this page are contained all the lists of number-one albums (according to total sales) from The Official Finnish Charts, beginning with 1989 when the first official Finnish charts were published.

Weekly albums charts
1989
1990199119921993199419951996199719981999
2000200120022003200420052006200720082009
2010201120122013201420152016201720182019
2020202120222023

Milestones

Most weeks at number one

Most total weeks on the chart

See also
The Official Finnish Charts
List of number-one singles (Finland)
Luettelot Suomen albumilistan ykkösistä vuosittain (1966–1988)  
 Luettelot Suomen virallisen albumilistan ykkösistä vuosittain (1989→) 
 Luettelot Suomen virallisen singlelistan ykkösistä (1951→)

External links
The Official Finnish Charts on IFPI Finland's official website
Archives of Finnish Charts including singles and albums mid-1995 to present 
The Official Finnish Charts on FinnishCharts.com
Archives of Finnish Albums Chart

References

Number-one albums